Károly Vass (1896–1953) was a Hungarian cinematographer. He worked in Germany during the silent era where he was often credited as Karl Vass.

Selected filmography
 Casanova (1918)
 Lili (1918)
 The Hustler (1920)
 Lucrezia Borgia (1922)
 The Island of Tears (1923)
 Paganini (1923)
 The Wonderful Adventure (1924)
 Should We Get Married? (1924)
 The Hanseatics (1925)
 Ballettratten (1925)
 Two and a Lady (1926)
 The Island of Forbidden Kisses (1927)
 The Hunt for the Bride (1927)
 Vacation from Marriage (1927)
 Intoxicated Love (1927)
 Nameless Woman (1927)
 Only a Viennese Woman Kisses Like That (1928)
 Sweet Pepper (1929)
 The Night Without Pause (1931)
 Grandstand for General Staff (1932)
 The Call of the Jungle (1936)
 Sarajevo (1940)

References

Bibliography
 Krautz, Alfred. International directory of cinematographers set- and costume designers in film: Volume VIII. Saur, 1989.

External links

1896 births
1953 deaths
Hungarian cinematographers
Film people from Budapest